The Thorn House in Alberton, Montana, located at 140 2nd St., was built in 1915.  It was listed on the National Register of Historic Places in 1997.

It was home of William "Bill" Thorn, an early Alberton storeowner and postmaster.  It was deemed notable as a "well-preserved residence representing Alberton's founding years. It is a typical family residence of the era, reflecting the working class character of this railroad town."

References

Houses on the National Register of Historic Places in Montana
Houses completed in 1915
National Register of Historic Places in Mineral County, Montana
1915 establishments in Montana
Bungalow architecture in Montana